Andrzej Marek Grzesik (born 4 January 1967) is a Polish politician. He was elected to Sejm on 25 September 2005, getting 9501 votes in 28 Częstochowa district as a candidate from Samoobrona Rzeczpospolitej Polskiej list.

He was also a member of Sejm 2001-2005.

See also
Members of Polish Sejm 2005-2007

External links
Andrzej Grzesik - parliamentary page - includes declarations of interest, voting record, and transcripts of speeches.

1967 births
Living people
People from Lubliniec
Members of the Polish Sejm 2005–2007
Members of the Polish Sejm 2001–2005
Self-Defence of the Republic of Poland politicians